During the 1905–06 English football season, Brentford competed in the Southern League First Division. The mid-table season is best-remembered for the Bees' appearance in the FA Cup proper for the first time in club history. After victories over Football League Second Division clubs Bristol City and Lincoln City in the first and second rounds respectively, Brentford were defeated in the third round by top-flight club Liverpool at Anfield.

Season summary 

After two successive mid-table seasons in the Southern League First Division and some positive showings in the FA Cup, Brentford manager Dick Molyneux was able to keep the majority of his full back and half back lines together for the 1905–06 season. He brought goalkeeper Tommy Spicer back from Leyton as cover for Walter Whittaker and cleared out the forward line, making six new additions, with five of the players possessing Football League experience – Walter Cookson, Fred Corbett, Willie Cross, Jack Dewhurst and Jimmy Hartley.

Three wins in the first four matches of the season put lifted Brentford high in the First Division table, but injury to Fred Corbett and the departure of Jack Dewhurst dropped the club back after successive defeats in late September and early October 1905. Molyneux re-signed forward Fred Hobson as a replacement for Dewhurst and together with fit-again Fred Corbett, the pair began to score regularly. Brentford's FA Cup campaign got underway in early December with a 4–0 fourth qualifying round victory over Southern League Second Division strugglers Wycombe Wanderers, a result which put Brentford in the first round proper of the FA Cup for the first time in the club's history. Brentford were drawn against Football League Second Division high-flyers Bristol City at Griffin Park and came back from a goal down to emerge 2–1 victors, with former City player Fred Corbett scoring both the Bees' goals. The best result in the club's history so far was achieved without manager Dick Molyneux, who was confined to his home with a serious illness.

In manager Molyneux's absence, trainer Bob Crone took over the day-to-day running of the team and the FA Cup second round draw produced a home tie versus Second Division club Lincoln City on 3 February 1906, whom Brentford swept aside 3–0 to go into the hat for the third round. Though the still-seriously ill Molyneux had not left the club, he was replaced by William Brown in mid-February, who took charge of Brentford's FA Cup third round tie at Anfield. After a week of hard training on Southport beach, the Bees produced a creditable performance in a 2–0 defeat and finally received national attention. The end of the cup run left Brentford with the league season to play out and despite never falling below 7th position between December and mid-April, five defeats from the final six matches dropped the club to a 9th-place finish. Former manager Dick Molyneux's contract was cancelled in May and he returned to Liverpool, where he died shortly after.

League table

Results
Brentford's goal tally listed first.

Legend

Southern League First Division

FA Cup 

 Source: 100 Years of Brentford

Playing squad

Left club during season

 Source: 100 Years of Brentford

Coaching staff

Dick Molyneux (2 September 1905 – January 1906)

Bob Crone (January – February 1906)

William Brown (February – 30 April 1906)

Statistics

Appearances

Goalscorers 

Players listed in italics left the club mid-season.
Source: 100 Years Of Brentford

Summary

References 

Brentford F.C. seasons
Brentford